HNoMS Vidar (N52) was a Royal Norwegian Navy minelayer and command vessel. Vidar was built by Mjellem & Karlsen in Bergen in 1977, and named after Odin's son Vidar from Norse mythology. The vessel was the command ship for NATO's "Mine Counter Measures Force North" (MCMFORNORTH) in 2004 and 2005. In 2006 she was sold to Lithuania and given the name Jotvingis. The Lithuanian Navy uses her as a command and support ship.

Her sister ship  was sold to Latvia in 2003.

References

External links
Royal Norwegian Navy web page

Vidar-class minesweepers
Ships built in Bergen
1977 ships
Mine warfare vessels of the Lithuanian Naval Force
Mine warfare vessels of Lithuania